Jayalathge Bernard Nihal Perera (27 May 1956 – 9 November 2012) was a Sri Lankan cricketer. He played eight first-class matches between 1980 and 1983.

Perera, a hard-hitting batsman, was twelfth man in Sri Lanka's first Test team, and shortly afterwards took part in Sri Lanka's first Test tour, to Pakistan in 1981–82, but he played none of the first-class matches on the tour.

Later in 1982 he toured South Africa with the Arosa Sri Lanka team. He was the team's highest scorer, with 450 runs in six first-class matches at an average of 40.90. He scored the team's only century, 102 in the second match against South Africa.

Along with the other members of the team he was banned from Sri Lankan cricket for making the unauthorized tour. After the ban was lifted several years later he coached the national women's team.

References

External links
 

1956 births
2012 deaths
Sri Lankan cricketers